Pierre François le Courayer (17 November 1681 – 17 October 1776) was a French Catholic theological writer, for many years an expatriate in England.

Life

Pierre François le Courayer was born at Rouen. While canon regular and librarian of the abbey of St Genevieve at Paris, he conducted a correspondence with Archbishop William Wake on the subject of episcopal succession in England, which supplied him with material for his work, Dissertation sur la validité des ordinations des Anglais et sur la succession des évéques de l'Eglise anglicane, avec les preuves justificatives des faits avancés (Dissertation on the validity of the Englishmen's ordinations and on the episcopal succession in the Anglican Church, with the justificatory proofs of the facts advanced), published anonymously in 1723 with a fake publication location of Brussels. That work was an attempt to prove that there has been no break in the line of ordination from the apostles to the clergy of the Church of England. 

The following year he wrote to the Journal des savants to put his name to the work, though his opinions exposed him to attacks from several theologians, a prosecution and 32 of his propositions being labelled heresies. He was rebuked by Louis Antoine de Noailles, archbishop of Paris then excommunicated by Jean XI Polinier, abbot of Sainte-Geneviève. He still did not recant his opinions but they had gained him supporters in Great Britain and with the help of Francis Atterbury, then in exile in Paris, he took refuge in England and was presented with a doctor's degree by the University of Oxford.

In 1732 he accepted that it was impossible to reconcile with his opponents in France and instead settled permanently in London as well as being granted a canonry in Oxford. In 1736 he published a French translation of Paolo Sarpi's History of the Council of Trent, and dedicated it to Queen Caroline, from whom he received a pension of £200 a year. Besides this he translated Johann Sleidan's History of the Reformation, and wrote several theological works. In his will, dated two years before his death, he declared himself still a member of the Roman Catholic Church, although dissenting from many of its opinions. He died in London, and was buried in the cloisters of Westminster Abbey.

References

Attribution

1681 births
1776 deaths
Writers from Rouen
French librarians
Historians of Christianity
Reformation historians
17th-century French Catholic theologians
17th-century French translators
18th-century French Catholic theologians
18th-century French translators